Virgilijus Vladislovas Bulovas (born 6 November 1939 in Kaunas, Lithuania) is a Lithuanian engineer and political figure. Bulovas is a former member of the Seimas and twice served on the Government of Lithuania as the Minister of the Interior.

Biography
Bulovas was born to a family of a military officer in Kaunas, Lithuania, on 6 November 1939. In 1941, after Soviet occupation, his father was deported to Siberia, where he later died.

Bulovas graduated from the Kaunas Polytechnics Institute in 1960, with a degree in electrical engineering, specializing in computers. He worked at the Institute until 1992, was awarded a doctorate degree in 1972 and became a docent in 1976. He co-wrote two computer science books and authored more than 50 scientific and educational papers.

Bulovas had been a member of the Communist Party of Lithuania since 1963. Upon independence he joined the ranks of Democratic Labour Party of Lithuania and, in the elections in 1992, was elected as the member of the Sixth Seimas through its electoral list.

In 1996 Bulovas was appointed the Minister of the Interior in the Government of Laurynas Stankevičius and served until the next elections to the Seimas. In 1997, he was appointed the Ambassador to Kazakhstan. Bulovas returned to the Ministry of the Interior in 2001, as a deputy-minister and, later, secretary under Juozas Bernatonis. In 2003 he succeeded Bernatonis as the Minister of the Interior in the Government of Algirdas Brazauskas.

References

Members of the Seimas
Politicians from Kaunas
1939 births
Kaunas University of Technology alumni
Academic staff of the Kaunas University of Technology
Ministers of Internal Affairs of Lithuania
Communist Party of Lithuania politicians
Democratic Labour Party of Lithuania politicians
Recipients of the Order of the Cross of Terra Mariana, 2nd Class
Living people